Mt. Gilead Christian Church is a historic church in Haskingsville, Kentucky. It was built in 1864 and added to the National Register of Historic Places in 1984.

It is a one-story brick church with brick laid in 1/5 American bond.

References

Baptist churches in Kentucky
Churches on the National Register of Historic Places in Kentucky
Federal architecture in Kentucky
Churches completed in 1864
19th-century Baptist churches in the United States
National Register of Historic Places in Green County, Kentucky
1864 establishments in Kentucky